Maria Cristina is a station in the Barcelona Metro and Trambaix networks, in the  Les Corts district of Barcelona. It is served by metro line L3 and tram lines T1, T2 and T3.

The metro station is located under Avinguda Diagonal, between Carrer del Doctor Ferran and Gran Via de Carles III. The tram station is located in the Avinguda Diagonal, immediately above the metro station. Both stations lie in front of the La Caixa headquarters in La Maternitat i Sant Ramon.

The metro station is named after Avinguda de la Reina Maria Cristina and was opened in 1975, along with the other stations of the section of L3 between Zona Universitària and Sants Estació stations. This section was originally operated separately from L3, and known as L3b, until the two sections were joined in 1982. The tram station was inaugurated in 2004, the year regular Trambaix service started.

See also
List of Barcelona Metro stations
List of tram stations in Barcelona

References

External links

Trenscat.com

Barcelona Metro line 3 stations
Railway stations in Spain opened in 1975
Trambaix stops
Transport in Les Corts (district)